The National Workers' Union (NWU) is a trade union in Saint Lucia. The NWU originated as a split from the Saint Lucia Workers' Union (SLWU) in 1973 when SLWU executive committee member Tyrone Maynard was removed and subsequently started the NWU.

References

Trade unions in Saint Lucia
International Trade Union Confederation
Trade unions established in 1973